Józef Fortuna (born 11 September 1952 in Maków Podhalański) is a Polish politician, member of the Law and Justice party. He was elected to the Sejm on 25 September 2005.

References

1952 births
Living people
People from Maków Podhalański
Law and Justice politicians
21st-century Polish politicians